Herpes simplex virus 1 and 2 (HSV-1 and HSV-2), also known by their taxonomical names Human alphaherpesvirus 1 and Human alphaherpesvirus 2, are two members of the human Herpesviridae family, a set of viruses that produce viral infections in the majority of humans. Both HSV-1 and HSV-2 are very common and contagious. They can be spread when an infected person begins shedding the virus.

As of 2016, about 67% of the world population under the age of 50 had HSV-1. In the United States, about 47.8% and 11.9% are estimated to have HSV-1 and HSV-2, respectively, though actual prevalence may be much higher. Because it can be transmitted through any intimate contact, it is one of the most common sexually transmitted infections.

Symptoms 
Many of those who are infected never develop symptoms. Symptoms, when they occur, may include watery blisters in the skin or mucous membranes of the mouth, lips, nose, genitals, or eyes (herpes simplex keratitis). Lesions heal with a scab characteristic of herpetic disease. Sometimes, the viruses cause mild or atypical symptoms during outbreaks. However, they can also cause more troublesome forms of herpes simplex. As neurotropic and neuroinvasive viruses, HSV-1 and -2 persist in the body by hiding from the immune system in the cell bodies of neurons, particularly in sensory ganglia. After the initial or primary infection, some infected people experience sporadic episodes of viral reactivation or outbreaks. In an outbreak, the virus in a nerve cell becomes active and is transported via the neuron's axon to the skin, where virus replication and shedding occur and may cause new sores.

Transmission

HSV-1 and HSV-2 are transmitted by contact with an infected person who has reactivations of the virus. 
HSV 1 and HSV-2 are periodically shed, most often asymptomatically. 

In a study of people with first-episode genital HSV-1 infection from 2022, genital shedding of HSV-1 was detected on 12% of days at 2 months and declined significantly to 7% of days at 11 months. Most genital shedding was asymptomatic; genital and oral lesions and oral shedding were rare.

Most sexual transmissions of HSV-2 occur during periods of asymptomatic shedding. Asymptomatic reactivation means that the virus causes atypical, subtle, or hard-to-notice symptoms that are not identified as an active herpes infection, so acquiring the virus is possible even if no active HSV blisters or sores are present. In one study, daily genital swab samples detected HSV-2 at a median of 12–28% of days among those who had an outbreak, and 10% of days among those with asymptomatic infection (no prior outbreaks), with many of these episodes occurring without visible outbreak ("subclinical shedding").

In another study, 73 subjects were randomized to receive valaciclovir 1 g daily or placebo for 60 days each in a two-way crossover design. A daily swab of the genital area was self-collected for HSV-2 detection by polymerase chain reaction, to compare the effect of valaciclovir versus placebo on asymptomatic viral shedding in immunocompetent, HSV-2 seropositive subjects without a history of symptomatic genital herpes infection. The study found that valaciclovir significantly reduced shedding during subclinical days compared to placebo, showing a 71% reduction; 84% of subjects had no shedding while receiving valaciclovir versus 54% of subjects on placebo. About 88% of patients treated with valaciclovir had no recognized signs or symptoms versus 77% for placebo.

For HSV-2, subclinical shedding may account for most of the transmission. Studies on discordant partners (one infected with HSV-2, one not) show that the transmission rate is approximately 5–8.9 per 10,000 sexual contacts, with condom usage greatly reducing the risk of acquisition. Atypical symptoms are often attributed to other causes, such as a yeast infection. HSV-1 is often acquired orally during childhood. It may also be sexually transmitted, including contact with saliva, such as kissing and oral sex. Historically HSV-2 was primarily a sexually transmitted infection, but rates of HSV-1 genital infections have been increasing for the last few decades.

Both viruses may also be transmitted vertically during childbirth.  However, the risk of transmission is minimal if the mother has no symptoms nor exposed blisters during delivery. The risk is considerable when the mother is infected with the virus for the first time during late pregnancy, reflecting high viral load. While most viral STDs can not be transmitted through objects as the virus dies quickly outside of the body, HSV can survive for up to 4.5 hours on surfaces and can be transmitted through use of towels, toothbrushes, cups, cutlery, etc.

Herpes simplex viruses can affect areas of skin exposed to contact with an infected person. An example of this is herpetic whitlow, which is a herpes infection on the fingers; it was common for dental surgeons prior to the routine use of gloves when treating patients. Shaking hands with an infected person does not transmit this disease. Genital infection of HSV-2 increases the risk of acquiring HIV.

Virology
HSV has been a model virus for many studies in molecular biology. For instance, one of the first functional promoters in eukaryotes was discovered in HSV (of the thymidine kinase gene) and the virion protein VP16 is one of the most-studied transcriptional activators.

Viral Structure

Animal herpes viruses all share some common properties. The structure of herpes viruses consists of a relatively large, double-stranded, linear DNA genome encased within an icosahedral protein cage called the capsid, which is wrapped in a lipid bilayer called the envelope. The envelope is joined to the capsid by means of a tegument. This complete particle is known as the virion. HSV-1 and HSV-2 each contain at least 74 genes (or open reading frames, ORFs) within their genomes, although speculation over gene crowding allows as many as 84 unique protein coding genes by 94 putative ORFs. These genes encode a variety of proteins involved in forming the capsid, tegument and envelope of the virus, as well as controlling the replication and infectivity of the virus. These genes and their functions are summarized in the table below.

The genomes of HSV-1 and HSV-2 are complex and contain two unique regions called the long unique region (UL) and the short unique region (US). Of the 74 known ORFs, UL contains 56 viral genes, whereas US contains only 12. Transcription of HSV genes is catalyzed by RNA polymerase II of the infected host. Immediate early genes, which encode proteins for example ICP22 that regulate the expression of early and late viral genes, are the first to be expressed following infection. Early gene expression follows, to allow the synthesis of enzymes involved in DNA replication and the production of certain envelope glycoproteins. Expression of late genes occurs last; this group of genes predominantly encode proteins that form the virion particle.

Five proteins from (UL) form the viral capsid - UL6, UL18, UL35, UL38, and the major capsid protein UL19.

Cellular Entry

Entry of HSV into a host cell involves several glycoproteins on the surface of the enveloped virus binding to their transmembrane receptors on the cell surface. Many of these receptors are then pulled inwards by the cell, which is thought to open a ring of three gHgL heterodimers stabilizing a compact conformation of the gB glycoprotein, so that it springs out and punctures the cell membrane. The envelope covering the virus particle then fuses with the cell membrane, creating a pore through which the contents of the viral envelope enters the host cell.

The sequential stages of HSV entry are analogous to those of other viruses. At first, complementary receptors on the virus and the cell surface bring the viral and cell membranes into proximity. Interactions of these molecules then form a stable entry pore through which the viral envelope contents are introduced to the host cell. The virus can also be endocytosed after binding to the receptors, and the fusion could occur at the endosome. In electron micrographs, the outer leaflets of the viral and cellular lipid bilayers have been seen merged; this hemifusion may be on the usual path to entry or it may usually be an arrested state more likely to be captured than a transient entry mechanism.

In the case of a herpes virus, initial interactions occur when two viral envelope glycoprotein called glycoprotein C (gC) and glycoprotein B (gB)  bind to a cell surface polysaccharide called heparan sulfate. Next, the major receptor binding protein, glycoprotein D (gD), binds specifically to at least one of three known entry receptors. These cell receptors include herpesvirus entry mediator (HVEM), nectin-1 and 3-O sulfated heparan sulfate. The nectin receptors usually produce cell-cell adhesion, to provide a strong point of attachment for the virus to the host cell. These interactions bring the membrane surfaces into mutual proximity and allow for other glycoproteins embedded in the viral envelope to interact with other cell surface molecules. Once bound to the HVEM, gD changes its conformation and interacts with viral glycoproteins H (gH) and L (gL), which form a complex. The interaction of these membrane proteins may result in a hemifusion state. gB interaction with the gH/gL complex creates an entry pore for the viral capsid. gB interacts with glycosaminoglycans on the surface of the host cell.

Genetic Inoculation
After the viral capsid enters the cellular cytoplasm, it starts to express viral protein ICP27. ICP27 is a regulator protein that causes disruption in host protein synthesis and utilizes it for viral replication. ICP27 binds with a cellular enzyme Serine-Arginine Protein Kinase 1, SRPK1. Formation of this complex causes the SRPK1 shift from the cytoplasm to the nucleus, and the viral genome gets transported to the cell nucleus.  Once attached to the nucleus at a nuclear entry pore, the capsid ejects its DNA contents via the capsid portal. The capsid portal is formed by 12 copies of portal protein, UL6, arranged as a ring; the proteins contain a leucine zipper sequence of amino acids, which allow them to adhere to each other. Each icosahedral capsid contains a single portal, located in one vertex.
The DNA exits the capsid in a single linear segment.

Immune Evasion
HSV evades the immune system through interference with MHC class I antigen presentation on the cell surface, by blocking the transporter associated with antigen processing (TAP) induced by the secretion of ICP-47 by HSV. In the host cell, TAP transports digested viral antigen epitope peptides from the cytosol to the endoplasmic reticulum, allowing these epitopes to be combined with MHC class I molecules and presented on the surface of the cell. Viral epitope presentation with MHC class I is a requirement for activation of cytotoxic T-lymphocytes (CTLs), the major effectors of the cell-mediated immune response against virally-infected cells. ICP-47 prevents initiation of a CTL-response against HSV, allowing the virus to survive for a protracted period in the host. HSV usually produces cytopathic effect (CPE) within 24–72 hours post-infection in permissive cell lines which is observed by classical plaque formation. However, HSV-1 clinical isolates have also been reported that did not show any CPE in Vero and A549 cell cultures over several passages with low level of virus protein expression. Probably these HSV-1 isolates are evolving towards a more "cryptic" form to establish chronic infection thereby unravelling yet another strategy to evade the host immune system, besides neuronal latency.

Replication

Following infection of a cell, a cascade of herpes virus proteins, called immediate-early, early, and late, is produced. Research using flow cytometry on another member of the herpes virus family, Kaposi's sarcoma-associated herpesvirus, indicates the possibility of an additional lytic stage, delayed-late. These stages of lytic infection, particularly late lytic, are distinct from the latency stage. In the case of HSV-1, no protein products are detected during latency, whereas they are detected during the lytic cycle.

The early proteins transcribed are used in the regulation of genetic replication of the virus. On entering the cell, an α-TIF protein joins the viral particle and aids in immediate-early transcription. The virion host shutoff protein (VHS or UL41) is very important to viral replication. This enzyme shuts off protein synthesis in the host, degrades host mRNA, helps in viral replication, and regulates gene expression of viral proteins. The viral genome immediately travels to the nucleus, but the VHS protein remains in the cytoplasm.

The late proteins form the capsid and the receptors on the surface of the virus. Packaging of the viral particles — including the genome, core and the capsid - occurs in the nucleus of the cell. Here, concatemers of the viral genome are separated by cleavage and are placed into formed capsids. HSV-1 undergoes a process of primary and secondary envelopment. The primary envelope is acquired by budding into the inner nuclear membrane of the cell. This then fuses with the outer nuclear membrane. The virus acquires its final envelope by budding into cytoplasmic vesicles.

Latent Infection
HSVs may persist in a quiescent but persistent form known as latent infection, notably in neural ganglia. HSV-1 tends to reside in the trigeminal ganglia, while HSV-2 tends to reside in the sacral ganglia, but these are historical tendencies only. During latent infection of a cell, HSVs express latency-associated transcript (LAT) RNA. LAT regulates the host cell genome and interferes with natural cell death mechanisms. By maintaining the host cells, LAT expression preserves a reservoir of the virus, which allows subsequent, usually symptomatic, periodic recurrences or "outbreaks" characteristic of nonlatency. Whether or not recurrences are symptomatic, viral shedding occurs to infect a new host.

A protein found in neurons may bind to herpes virus DNA and regulate latency. Herpes virus DNA contains a gene for a protein called ICP4, which is an important transactivator of genes associated with lytic infection in HSV-1. Elements surrounding the gene for ICP4 bind a protein known as the human neuronal protein neuronal restrictive silencing factor (NRSF) or human repressor element silencing transcription factor (REST). When bound to the viral DNA elements, histone deacetylation occurs atop the ICP4 gene sequence to prevent initiation of transcription from this gene, thereby preventing transcription of other viral genes involved in the lytic cycle. Another HSV protein reverses the inhibition of ICP4 protein synthesis. ICP0 dissociates NRSF from the ICP4 gene and thus prevents silencing of the viral DNA.

Genome 
The HSV genome spans about 150,000 bp and consists of two unique segments, named unique long (UL) and unique short (US), as well as terminal inverted repeats found to the two ends of them named repeat long (RL) and repeat short (RS). There are also minor "terminal redundancy" (α) elements found on the further ends of RS. The overall arrangement is RL-UL-RL-α-RS-US-RS-α with each pair of repeats inverting each other. The whole sequence is then encapsuled in a terminal direct repeat. The long and short parts each have their own origins of replication, with OriL located between UL28 and UL30 and OriS located in a pair near the RS. As the L and S segments can be assembled in any direction, they can be inverted relative to each other freely, forming various linear isomers.

Gene expression 
HSV genes are expressed in 3 temporal classes: immediate early (IE or α), early (E or ß) and late (γ) genes. However, the progression of viral gene expression is rather gradual than in clearly distinct stages. Immediate early genes are transcribed right after infection and their gene products activate transcription of the early genes. Early gene products help to replicate the viral DNA. Viral DNA replication, in turn, stimulates the expression of the late genes, encoding the structural proteins.

Transcription of the immediate early (IE) genes begins right after virus DNA enters the nucleus. All virus genes are transcribed by host RNA polymerase II. Although host proteins are sufficient for virus transcription, viral proteins are necessary for the transcription of certain genes. For instance, VP16 plays an important role in IE transcription and the virus particle apparently brings it into the host cell, so that it does not need to be produced first. Similarly, the IE proteins RS1 (ICP4), UL54 (ICP27), and ICP0 promote the transcription of the early (E) genes. Like IE genes, early gene promoters contain binding sites for cellular transcription factors. One early protein, ICP8, is necessary for both transcription of late genes and DNA replication.

Later in the life cycle of HSV, expression of immediate early and early genes is shut down. This is mediated by specific virus proteins, e.g. ICP4, which represses itself by binding to elements in its own promoter. As a consequence, the down-regulation of ICP4 levels leads to a reduction of early and late gene expression, as ICP4 is important for both.

Importantly, HSV shuts down host cell RNA, DNA and protein synthesis to direct cellular resources to virus production. First, the virus  protein vhs induces the degradation of existing mRNAs early in infection. Other viral genes impede cellular transcription and translation. For instance, ICP27 inhibits RNA splicing, so that virus mRNAs (which are usually not spliced) gain an advantage over host mRNAs. Finally,  virus proteins destabilize certain cellular proteins involved in the host cell cycle, so that both cell division and host cell DNA replication disturbed in favor of virus replication.

Evolution

The herpes simplex 1 genomes can be classified into six clades. Four of these occur in East Africa, one in East Asia and one in Europe and North America. This suggests that the virus may have originated in East Africa. The most recent common ancestor of the Eurasian strains appears to have evolved ~60,000 years ago. The East Asian HSV-1 isolates have an unusual pattern that is currently best explained by the two waves of migration responsible for the peopling of Japan.

Herpes simplex 2 genomes can be divided into two groups: one is globally distributed and the other is mostly limited to sub Saharan Africa. The globally distributed genotype has undergone four ancient recombinations with herpes simplex 1. It has also been reported that HSV-1 and HSV-2 can have contemporary and stable recombination events in hosts simultaneously infected with both pathogens. All of the cases are HSV-2 acquiring parts of the HSV-1 genome, sometimes changing parts of its antigen epitope in the process.

The mutation rate has been estimated to be ~1.38×10−7 substitutions/site/year. In clinical setting, the mutations in either the thymidine kinase gene or DNA polymerase gene has caused resistance to aciclovir. However, most of the mutations occur in the thymidine kinase gene rather than the DNA polymerase gene.

Another analysis has estimated the mutation rate in the herpes simplex 1 genome to be 1.82×10−8 nucleotide substitution per site per year. This analysis placed the most recent common ancestor of this virus ~710,000 years ago.

Treatment

Similar to other herpesviridae, the herpes simplex viruses establish latent lifelong infection, and thus cannot be eradicated from the body with current treatments.

Treatment usually involves general-purpose antiviral drugs that interfere with viral replication, reduce the physical severity of outbreak-associated lesions, and lower the chance of transmission to others. Studies of vulnerable patient populations have indicated that daily use of antivirals such as aciclovir and valaciclovir can reduce reactivation rates. The extensive use of antiherpetic drugs has led to the development of some drug resistance, which in turn may lead to treatment failure. Therefore, new sources of drugs are broadly investigated to address the problem. In January 2020, a comprehensive review article was published that demonstrated the effectiveness of natural products as promising anti-HSV drugs. Pyrithione, a zinc ionophore, has shown antiviral activity against herpes simplex.

Alzheimer's disease
In 1979, it was reported that there is a possible link between HSV-1 and Alzheimer's disease, in people with the epsilon4 allele of the gene APOE. HSV-1 appears to be particularly damaging to the nervous system and increases one's risk of developing Alzheimer's disease. The virus interacts with the components and receptors of lipoproteins, which may lead to the development of Alzheimer's disease. This research identifies HSVs as the pathogen most clearly linked to the establishment of Alzheimer's. According to a study done in 1997, without the presence of the gene allele, HSV-1 does not appear to cause any neurological damage or increase the risk of Alzheimer's. However, a more recent prospective study published in 2008 with a cohort of 591 people showed a statistically significant difference between patients with antibodies indicating recent reactivation of HSV and those without these antibodies in the incidence of Alzheimer's disease, without direct correlation to the APOE-epsilon4 allele.

The trial had a small sample of patients who did not have the antibody at baseline, so the results should be viewed as highly uncertain. In 2011, Manchester University scientists showed that treating HSV1-infected cells with antiviral agents decreased the accumulation of β-amyloid and tau protein and also decreased HSV-1 replication.

A 2018 retrospective study from Taiwan on 33,000 patients found that being infected with herpes simplex virus increased the risk of dementia 2.56 times (95% CI: 2.3-2.8) in patients not receiving anti-herpetic medications (2.6 times for HSV-1 infections  and 2.0 times for HSV-2 infections).  However, HSV-infected patients who were receiving anti-herpetic medications (acyclovir, famciclovir, ganciclovir, idoxuridine, penciclovir, tromantadine, valaciclovir, or valganciclovir) showed no elevated risk of dementia compared to patients uninfected with HSV.

Multiplicity reactivation
Multiplicity reactivation (MR) is the process by which viral genomes containing inactivating damage interact within an infected cell to form a viable viral genome. MR was originally discovered with the bacterial virus bacteriophage T4, but was subsequently also found with pathogenic viruses including influenza virus, HIV-1, adenovirus simian virus 40, vaccinia virus, reovirus, poliovirus and herpes simplex virus.

When HSV particles are exposed to doses of a DNA damaging agent that would be lethal in single infections, but are then allowed to undergo multiple infection (i.e. two or more viruses per host cell), MR is observed. Enhanced survival of HSV-1 due to MR occurs upon exposure to different DNA damaging agents, including methyl methanesulfonate, trimethylpsoralen (which causes inter-strand DNA cross-links), and UV light. After treatment of genetically marked HSV with trimethylpsoralen, recombination between the marked viruses increases, suggesting that trimethylpsoralen damage stimulates recombination. MR of HSV appears to partially depend on the host cell recombinational repair machinery since skin fibroblast cells defective in a component of this machinery (i.e. cells from Bloom's syndrome patients) are deficient in MR.

These observations suggest that MR in HSV infections involves genetic recombination between damaged viral genomes resulting in production of viable progeny viruses. HSV-1, upon infecting host cells, induces inflammation and oxidative stress. Thus it appears that the HSV genome may be subjected to oxidative DNA damage during infection, and that MR may enhance viral survival and virulence under these conditions.

Use as an anti-cancer agent

Modified Herpes simplex virus is considered as a potential therapy for cancer and has been extensively clinically tested to assess its oncolytic (cancer killing) ability.  Interim overall survival data from Amgen's phase 3 trial of a genetically attenuated herpes virus suggests efficacy against melanoma.

Use in neuronal connection tracing

Herpes simplex virus is also used as a transneuronal tracer defining connections among neurons by virtue of traversing synapses.

Other related outcomes
HSV-2 the most common cause of Mollaret's meningitis. HSV-1 can lead to potentially fatal cases of herpes simplex encephalitis. Herpes simplex viruses have also been studied in the central nervous system disorders such as multiple sclerosis, but research has been conflicting and inconclusive.

Following a diagnosis of genital herpes simplex infection, patients may develop an episode of profound depression. In addition to offering antiviral medication to alleviate symptoms and shorten their duration, physicians must also address the mental health impact of a new diagnosis. Providing information on the very high prevalence of these infections, their effective treatments, and future therapies in development may provide hope to patients who are otherwise demoralized.

Research

There exist commonly used vaccines to some herpesviruses, such as the veterinary vaccine HVT/LT (Turkey herpesvirus vector laryngotracheitis vaccine). However, it prevents atherosclerosis (which histologically mirrors atherosclerosis in humans) in target animals vaccinated.
The only human vaccines available for herpesviruses are for Varicella zoster virus, given to children around their first birthday to prevent chickenpox (varicella), or to adults to prevent an outbreak of shingles (herpes zoster) . There is, however, no human vaccine for herpes simplex viruses. As of 2022, there are active pre-clinical and clinical studies underway on herpes simplex in humans; vaccines are being developed for both treatment and prevention.

References

External links
 
 Herpes simplex: Host viral protein interactions: A database of HSV-1 interacting host proteins 
 3D macromolecular structures of the Herpes simplex virus archived in the EM Data Bank(EMDB)

Simplexviruses
Unaccepted virus taxa
Sexually transmitted diseases and infections
Articles containing video clips